Jalgaon (Jamod) Assembly constituency is a constituency of Maharashtra Vidhan Sabha. It located in the Buldhana district. It is a part of the Buldhana Lok Sabha constituency.

The Malkapur Assembly constituency in Buldhana district is a part of Raver from the neighbouring Jalgaon district.

As of 2008, the constituency includes Sangrampur tehsil, Jalgaon(Jamod) tehsil and part of Shegaon tehsil, consisting of Shegaon and Manasgaon revenue circles and Shegaon Municipal Council. The remaining part of Shegaon tehsil is in Khamgaon Assembly constituency.

The constituency was established in 1951 as the then Madhya Pradesh Vidhan Sabha (Assembly) constituency located in the Buldhana district. However it was dissolved for the 1957 elections to Mumbai state.

It was re-established for the 2009 state elections in Maharashtra.

Member of Legislative Assembly

See also
Jalamb Assembly constituency
Jalgaon (Jamod)
Sangrampur, Maharashtra
Shegaon

References

Assembly constituencies of Maharashtra